Jane Maria Atkinson (née Richmond; 15 September 1824 – 29 September 1914) was a New Zealand pioneer, writer, and the first Pākehā woman to climb Mount Taranaki.

Early life
Maria grew up in a Unitarian household. The early death of her father, Christopher Richmond, caused financial strife for the family. At the age of 28, Maria and her family left for New Zealand along with the Hursthouses, Richmonds, and Ronalds. There were many inter-marriages between these family which became referred to as 'the mob' that settled around New Plymouth. The Richmonds arrived in Auckland 25 May 1853. They then settled in the early New Plymouth colony. She and Arthur Atkinson had a shipboard romance and were married 30 December 1854.

New Zealand
Maria initially fulfilled the traditional role of pioneering housewife and mother. When she and Arthur moved to Nelson in 1867 she became active in the community.  She promoted women's suffrage, campaigned for a girl's college and ran a debate team.  The Atkinsons allowed the newly opened Nelson College for Girls faculty to use their home, Fairfield House.

References

Further reading
Born to New Zealand: A Biography of Jane Maria Atkinson by Frances Porter (1989, Allen & Unwin/Port Nicholson Press, Wellington) 

1824 births
1914 deaths
People from Taranaki
New Zealand feminists
19th-century New Zealand people
Atkinson–Hursthouse–Richmond family
Fell family